Monkeyman and O'Brien is an American comic book series created by artist Art Adams in 1993. The series was published from 1993 to 1999 by Dark Horse Comics in various types of installments including short features in anthologies, backup stories in other series, a three issue limited series, a two issue crossover series and a comic strip in the promotional newspaper Dark Horse Extra. In 1997, a trade paperback collection of the five comic issues was published.

Characters
The series follows the story of Ann O'Brien, the daughter of a missing scientist, who at the time of his disappearance was working on experiments in interdimensional travel. When one of her father's experimental machines was accidentally activated by Ann, it teleported from another dimension Axwell Tiberius (also known as "Monkeyman"), a  super-intelligent gorilla-like being that Adams conceived as "the Reed Richards of the gorilla world". The same accident also bathed Ann in a mysterious radiation which caused her grow to seven feet tall and endowed her with superhuman strength, endurance and speed. Axewell quickly became Ann's friend and the two went on to face numerous Silver Age–style threats including the "Shrewmanoid" and the "Froglodytes". The duo also encountered the Image Comics super-team Gen¹³. In the last Monkeyman and O'Brien stories published to date, humorous situations arise between the pair such as O'Brien growing to colossal size after being hit by one of Monkeyman's experimental devices. Monkeyman's brother Nonny O'Brien also features in the series.

Villains the series include:
 Akiko Oki, O'Brien's friend and assistant. She shares the vast O'Brien estate, sets up appointments, and takes on any non-science- or law-related task that O'Brien assigns. Before the arrival of Tiberius she was O'Brien's closest companion, regularly joining her for workouts or sharing new clothes.
 The Shrewmanoid, a mysterious handyman and lumberjack who encountered alien technology that transformed him into a giant, anthropomorphic shrew. The transformation left the Shrewmanoid with all of his intelligence, albeit deranged, and he moved swiftly to become a supervillain. He can command subterranean monsters to do his bidding but has exhibited no other special powers. The Shrewmanoid is convinced that he is a supremely evolved being: Indeed, he believed this even before his transformation. After he saw news reports of a San Francisco scientist transforming into a seven-foot-tall superhero he led an army of monsters to San Francisco to capture her. He failed and was sucked into another dimension, "The Negative Zone," where he fended for himself until Monkeyman and O'Brien arrived there on an exploratory mission. They rescued him in order to imprison him on Earth, but after the Shrewmanoid professed his love for O'Brien and she rejected him, he bit her and escaped. As of the last Monkeyman and O'Brien story the Shrewmanoid was still at large. He appeared again in John Byrne's 1994 Babe 2 in which he tried to capture the titular amazonian hero (physically similar to O'Brien, although not as tall) and failed. (First appearance: Babe 2 #1, 1994)
 The Froglodytes, a race of world-conquering, intelligent frogs. One of their ships was plotting an attack on Earth and scouring the planet for threats when they found Axewell Tiberius. They teleported him into their custody, but O'Brien arrived with him and the two of them sabotaged the Froglodytes' plan. As O'Brien distracted the creatures and mangled their control room, Tiberius sent a false alarm to the rest of the fleet, convincing them that the Earth was already under attack from giant insects. The Froglodytes fled after that message. (First appearance: Monkeyman and O'Brien #2, 1996)

References

External links
 Monkeyman and O'Brien comic strip from Dark Horse Extra animated by Dark Horse for a website promotion in 2000.
 Cover image of Darkhorse Presents #80 at darkhorse.com

Characters created by Art Adams
Comics characters introduced in 1993
Dark Horse Comics titles
Fictional scientists in comics
Gorilla characters in comics